Tennerton is an unincorporated community along the Buckhannon River, directly south of Buckhannon in Upshur County, West Virginia, United States.

Tennerton's public schools are operated by Upshur County Schools.

Unincorporated communities in Upshur County, West Virginia
Unincorporated communities in West Virginia